Su Yuling (born 24 April 1989, Changle, Fujian) is a Chinese female sport shooter. At the 2012 Summer Olympics, she competed in the Women's 10 metre air pistol finishing in 6th place.

References

Chinese female sport shooters
Living people
Olympic shooters of China
Shooters at the 2012 Summer Olympics
Asian Games medalists in shooting
Shooters at the 2010 Asian Games
1989 births
Universiade medalists in shooting
Sportspeople from Fuzhou
Asian Games bronze medalists for China
Medalists at the 2010 Asian Games
Sport shooters from Fujian
Universiade bronze medalists for China
Medalists at the 2013 Summer Universiade
21st-century Chinese women